This is a list of football clubs in Maldives, which compete in the various divisions of Maldivian football league system.

Clubs

8
 8 Degree

A
 Adventurers 
 Ahly Sports
 ASA Nooraaneemaage (Hithadhou Island)
 Astron
 Amigos Sports Club ( L.Gan)
 Fc Amigos (A.A. Thoddoo)

B
 B. Hiriyaa
 B.G. Sports Club

C
 Club All Youth Linkage
 Club Baico
 Club Eagles Male
 Club Lagoons
 Club Gaamagu
 Club Green Streets
 Club Teenage
 Club Valencia
 Customs
 Corals Kulhudhuffushi
 Club PK

D
 Dhiyamigili Z.J.
 D.N.C. (Delightful Neighbours Club)
 D.X. Sports Club
 Dribbles Kulhudhuffushi
  The sports club

E
 Ekuveru Roshan Club
 Ever Radiant
 Eydhafushi Z.J./ Youth

F
 F.C. Baaz kn rashehtha miee? 
 F.C. Cicada
 Florentina
 Foakaidhoo Zuvaanunge Jamiyya(Foakaidhoo F.C)
 Foundation For Vilufushi Development
  Fc Falcons ( A.A Thoddoo )

G
 Galolhu S.C.
 Gamu Mathimaradhoo
 Gamu Muguri
 Gamu Mukurimagaa
 Gamu Thundi
 Guraidhoo Z.J.
 Gulhee Z.J.

H
 Haspress Club Hinnavaru
 Hilalee Sports
 Hinnavaru
 Hithadoo Youth Wing
 Hithadu Society View
 Hoadhandu Fuahmulah
 Huraa
 Hurriyya SC
 Hirafus Kulhudhuffushi

I
 Island Football Club (I.F.C.)
 Island Juniors Addu

J
 Jaamiyyathul Ikhvaan

K
 Kalhaidhoo ZJ
 Kelaa Y.F.
 Keyodhoo R.C.
 Kin'bidhoo Innovative Network (K.I.N.)
 Kissaru
 Kolhufushi
 Kudahuvadhoo Reynees Ginthi
 Kulhudhuffushi Z.J.

L
 Laamu Kalhaidhoo
 Little Town
 Lazer

M
 Maabaidhoo Isdharivarunge Gulhun
 Maadhamaa Hanimadhoo Z.J.
 Maamendhoo
 Maavah
 Maarandhoo Y.S.
 Maziya Sports & Recreation Club
 Maglas Club Kulhudhuffushi
 Mahibadhoo Rayyithunge Jamiyya
 Mahibadhoo Zuvaanunge Jamiyya
 Maldives Transport And Contracting Company
 Maradhoo Island Community
 Masveringe Club Vilingili
 Mecano S.C.
 Meedhoo
 Mekku
 Mifaharu
 Miladhoo Sports Club
 Ministry Of Construction And Public Infrastructure
 Muiyveyo
 Mathimaradhoo Z.J.
 Mulah M. Z.J.
 Mulaku Ekuveringe Jamiyya
 Mulaku Z.J.
 Mulee Z.J.
 Muli Meemu

N
 Naadhee Ahthamadhun
 Naalaafushi Adhi M.
 Naavaidhoo Z.J.
 Naavaidhu School Isdharivarunge Jamiyya
 Naifaru Juvenile
 Nasandhura Palace Hotel
 New Lagoons
 New Radiant SC 
 Newstar
 N.L.D.
 Nolhivaram Club Thiladhunmathi
 Nooraaneemaage A.S.A.
Nilandhoo Sports Club (NSC)

O
 Oceans Male
 Orchid

P
 Presidents Office
 Pk Kayotes

R
 Rasdhoo J.U.
 Real Maradhoo
 Red Line Club
 Rock Street Sports Club
 Roma
 Rebels fc Vashafaru

S
 S.C. Taiba
 S.C. Veloxia
 School Isdharivarun Landhoo
 Sosun Club Thoddoo
 Speed Star Maaen'boodhoo
 State Trading Organization
 S.T.E.L.C.O. Male

T
 TFM Sports Club
 T.C.M.O.
 Talented Teens
 Thoddoo FC
 Thinadhoo Sports
 Thinadhoo T.I.M.F.E.S.
 Thinadhoo United
 Thinadhoo Zuvaanunge Club
 Torino

U
 United Victory

V
 VB Addu FC
 Velidhoo Hafman Club
 Veymandoo Z.J.
 Veyvah
 Vicenza
 Victory SC
 Vinsoria
 Viyansa
 Veyru Sports Club

Z
 Zamaanee Club
 ZigZag Kulhudhuffushi

External links
 Football Association of Maldives
 Maldives - Club Soccer

Maldives
 
Football clubs
Football clubs